Everton Under-23s compete in Premier League 2 and play their home matches at Haig Avenue in Southport. On occasion, they are permitted to play at Goodison Park. Both the Under-23 and Under-18 players have been based at their Finch Farm training complex since its completion in 2007.

Players

Under-21 squad

Out on loan

Under-18 squad

Player of the season 
Under-23s: 
Victor Anichebe (2006)
John Irving (2007)
John Irving (2008)
Kieran Agard (2009)
Shane Duffy (2010)
Jose Baxter (2011)
Adam Forshaw (2012)
N/A (2013)
Tyias Browning (2014)
Brendan Galloway (2015)
Joe Williams (2016)
Jonjoe Kenny (2017)
Morgan Feeney (2018)
Nathan Broadhead (2019)
Anthony Gordon (2020)
Ryan Astley (2021)

Academy: 
 Scott Phelan (2006)
 Shaun Densmore (2007)
 Jack Rodwell (2008)
 James McCarten (2009)
 Adam Davies (2010)
 Jake Bidwell (2011)
 Hallam Hope (2012)
 Chris Long (2013)
 Ryan Ledson (2014)
 Harry Charsley (2015)

Academy staff 

Remaining academy staff:
Lead Coaches: Paul Bennett, Tom Kearney, Paul Tait
 Coaching Team: Peter Cavanagh, Phil Jevons, Colin Littlejohns, John Miles, Kevin O'Brien, Joe Peterson, Scott Phelan, Tom Gardner, Andy Cowley, Ross Morrison
 Sports Science & Medicine: John McKeown, Peter Beirne, Lewis Charnock, Nick Coleman, Jack Dowling, Dan Carney, Josh Jeffery, Matthew Lowe, Leah McCready
 Recruitment: Sam Bailey, Michael Cribley, Paul Johnson, Darren Kearns, Ian Lavery, Ray Redmond, Nicola Woods.
 Education & Welfare: Chris Adamson, Phil McQuaid, Darren Murphy
 Operations: Daniel Manning, Sean Farrington, Vincent Fieldstead, Rob How, John King, Daniel Manning, Danny Webb, Sean McClure, Keith Loyden
 Analytics and Strategic Planning: Owen O’Connor

Awards and honours 

  Premier League 2:
 Winners (2): 2016–17, 2018–19
 Premier League Cup:
 Winners (1): 2019
Lancashire Senior Cup:
 Winners (7): 1894, 1897, 1910, 1935, 1940, 1964, 2016
 Liverpool Senior Cup:
 Winners (40): 1884, 1886, 1887, 1890, 1891, 1892, 1894, 1895, 1896, 1898, 1899, 1900, 1904, 1906, 1908, 1911, 1914, 1919, 1921, 1922, 1923, 1924, 1926, 1928, 1938, 1940, 1945, 1953, 1954, 1956, 1957, 1959, 1960, 1961, 1983, 1996, 2003, 2005, 2007, 2016
 Joint Winners (6): 1910, 1912, 1934, 1936, 1958, 1982
  SuperCupNI:
 Winners (7): 1995 (Junior), 2002 (Junior), 2008 (Junior), 2009 (Junior), 2011 (Junior), 2013 (Junior), 2016 (Elite)
 Runners-up (3): 1999 (Junior), 2004 (Junior), 2012 (Junior)
  U18 Premier League:
 Winners (1): 2014
  Future Champions Tournament:
 Runners-up (3): 2013
  Premier Academy League:
 Winners (1): 2011
  FA Youth Cup:
 Winners (3):  1965, 1984, 1998
 Runners-up (4):  1961, 1977, 1983, 2002
The Central League:
 Winners (4): 1914, 1938, 1954, 1968
CEE Cup
Winners (1): 2017

References

External links 
 The Everton Way – Everton Academy Online
 Everton Shareholds Association – Tour of Finch Farm
 The School of Science
 Information about the academy from ToffeeWeb
 Discussions about the youth teams, results and the future stars from ToffeeTalk
 PitchCare Magazine Article
 Dr Pepper Dallas Cup® XXXIII: April 1 – 8, 2012
 2011 NI Milk Cup
 Premier Academy Youth League Champions

Reserves And Academy
Football academies in England
Lancashire League (football)
Premier League International Cup